The Deutsche Evangelisch Lutherische Zion Kirche, also known as Our Redeemer Lutheran Church of Marysville, is a historic church building in Staplehurst, Nebraska. It was built in 1917 "as the culmination
of the fund-raising efforts of farmers in rural Seward County." It was designed in the Late Gothic Revival style by George A. Berlinghof and Ellery L. Davis. It has been listed on the National Register of Historic Places since June 25, 1982.

References

External links

National Register of Historic Places in Seward County, Nebraska
Gothic Revival church buildings in Nebraska
Churches completed in 1917